Bercovici is a surname. Notable people with the surname include:

 Eric Bercovici (1933–2014), American film and television producer, screenwriter
 Israil Bercovici (1921–1988), Romanian dramatist, playwright, director, biographer and memoirist
 Konrad Bercovici (1882–1961), Romanian-American writer
 Martin Bercovici (1902–1971), Romanian electrical engineer
 Mike Bercovici (born 1993), American football quarterback
 Noël Bernard Bercovici (1925–1981), Romanian journalist
 Philippe Bercovici (born 1963), French comics artist
 Luca Bercovici  (born 1957), American film and television producer, actor, writer, director